In the Folds of the Flesh is a 1970 Italian / Spanish giallo film produced and directed by Sergio Bergonzelli. The screenplay was co-written by Fabio De Agostini and Bergonzelli, from a story outline by Mario Caiano. Ferdinando Merighi and Juan Vilches were the assistant directors.

It starred Eleonora Rossi Drago and Anna Maria Pierangeli. It was released in Spain as Las endemoniadas ("The Possessed") and years later on French video as La Folle (The Madness).

Plot
An escaped convict named Pascal Gorriot happens to witness an attractive woman named Lucille disposing of her second husband Andre's corpse.

Thirteen years later, Andre's cousin shows up at Lucille's villa and he is stabbed to death by Andre's daughter (Falaise) who is still living there. Lucille's son kills the visiting cousin's pet dog who arrived with him. Soon after, another friend of the family moves into the villa and seduces the criminally insane Falaise, who decapitates him afterwards.

The escaped convict returns to the scene, down on his luck, and decides to blackmail Lucille for murdering her husband years earlier. He winds up in an acid bath.

The police investigate the chain of murders going on at the villa. The film even has a brief flashback to a WW2 Nazi death camp, scenes from which were used exploitatvely in the sleeve design of the British Redemption video release.

Cast 
 Eleonora Rossi Drago - Lucille
 Anna Maria Pierangeli - Ester Gardere/Falaise Gardere
 Emilio Gutiérrez Caba - Colin
 Fernando Sancho - Pascal Gorriot
 Victor Alcazar - Michel Bordelin
 Maria Rosa Schlauza - Elizabeth
 Alfredo Mayo - police inspector
 Giancarlo Sisti - Andre
 Luciano Lorcas Catenacci - Antoine
 Gaetano Imbro
 Bruno Ciangola

Critical Reception
Adrian Luther Smith commented "The film has enough aberrant behavior and neuroses to keep a conference of psychologists busy for a week...a ridiculous overwrought trash masterpiece.....the film even manages to drag in Etruscan skeletons, squawking vultures and flashbacks to a Nazi death camp.....the multiple beheadings are painfully unconvincing.". He added "The plot is so convoluted and bizarre, it defies serious explanation."

Release
The only uncut VHS release of this film was the letterboxed British Redemption video which ran 88 minutes, and had a BBFC 18 Certificate. Severin Films released what they claim is an uncut "87-minute" print on DVD in 2008, "fully restored from the Italian vault elements". The film was released on video in Argentina as Mansion Sangriamente, in France as La Folle, and in Greece as Felicity.

References

External links 

 Film Review: In the Folds of Flesh (Nelle pieghe della carne) (1970)
 Anatomy of the Irrational: An attempt to explain In the Folds of the Flesh - Diabolique Magazine

1970 drama films
1970 films
Spanish thriller drama films
Giallo films
Films produced by Sergio Bergonzelli
1970s Italian films
1970s Spanish films